Alfred Dixon may refer to:

 Alfred Cardew Dixon (1865–1936), English mathematician
 Alfred Herbert Dixon (1857–1920), British businessman